Alturas (Spanish for "Heights"; Achumawi: Kasalektawi) is a city and the county seat of Modoc County, California. Located in the Shasta Cascade region of Northern California, the city had a population of 2,715 at the 2020 census. Alturas is one of the largest cities in the region and a local economic hub.

History 

Alturas occupies what was initially an Achumawi (Pit River) village known as Kosealekte or Kasalektawi.  The city was initially known as Dorris Bridge or Dorris' Bridge, named after Pressley and James Dorris, who built a bridge across the Pit River at this location.

The Dorris Bridge post office opened in 1871. The town was renamed Dorrisville in 1874 and Alturas in 1876, the latter meaning "heights" in Spanish.  The census of 1880 showed a population of 148.  However, settlement continued over the next two decades, until the city was incorporated on September 16, 1901.  Because of its central location, Dorrisville became the county seat when Modoc County formed in 1874, even though both Adin and Cedarville were then larger towns.

Geography
The tall Warner Mountains lie to the east, the wetlands and wild rice fields of South Fork Valley to the south, and the extensive Modoc Plateau to the north.

Climate
The climate in Alturas has a dry-summer continental climate (Köppen: Dsb). Freezing temperatures have occurred in every month of the year; cool nights are common even on the hottest summer days.

Precipitation averages  annually. There are an average of 90.8 days with measurable precipitation.

Demographics

2000

At the 2000 census there were 2,892 people in 1,181 households, including 753 families, in the city. The racial makeup of the city was 85.9% White, 0.3% Black or African American, 4.4% Native American, 0.7% Asian, 0.1% Pacific Islander, 4.8% from other races, and 3.7% from two or more races.  11.9% of the population were Hispanic or Latino of any race.
Of the 1,181 households 35.3% had children under the age of 18 living with them, 45.6% were married couples living together, 14.1% had a female householder with no husband present, and 36.2% were non-families. 32.5% of households were one person and 14.5% were one person aged 65 or older.  The average household size was 2.38 and the average family size was 3.00.

The age distribution was 28.7% under the age of 18, 6.6% from 18 to 24, 24.9% from 25 to 44, 22.9% from 45 to 64, and 16.9% 65 or older.  The median age was 38 years. For every 100 females, there were 90.5 males.  For every 100 females age 18 and over, there were 85.3 males.

The median household income was $24,351 and the median family income  was $31,385. Males had a median income of $36,500 versus $21,750 for females. The per capita income for the city was $19,281.  About 23.0% of families and 27.1% of the population were below the poverty line, including 38.3% of those under age 18 and 7.9% of those age 65 or over.

2010

At the 2010 census Alturas had a population of 2,827. The racial makeup of Alturas was 2,430 (86.0%) White, 15 (0.5%) African American, 81 (2.9%) Native American, 45 (1.6%) Asian, 7 (0.2%) Pacific Islander, 118 (4.2%) from other races, and 131 (4.6%) from two or more races. Hispanic or Latino of any race were 347 people (12.3%).

The census reported that 2,814 people (99.5% of the population) lived in households, none lived in non-institutionalized group quarters, and 13 (0.5%) were institutionalized.

There were 1,238 households, 391 (31.6%) had children under the age of 18 living in them, 507 (41.0%) were opposite-sex married couples living together, 181 (14.6%) had a female householder with no husband present, 65 (5.3%) had a male householder with no wife present.  There were 102 (8.2%) unmarried opposite-sex partnerships, and 9 (0.7%) same-sex married couples or partnerships. 403 households (32.6%) were one person and 160 (12.9%) had someone living alone who was 65 or older. The average household size was 2.27.  There were 753 families (60.8% of households); the average family size was 2.85.

The age distribution was 702 people (24.8%) under the age of 18, 219 people (7.7%) aged 18 to 24, 672 people (23.8%) aged 25 to 44, 802 people (28.4%) aged 45 to 64, and 432 people (15.3%) who were 65 or older.  The median age was 39.9 years. For every 100 females, there were 92.7 males.  For every 100 females age 18 and over, there were 88.6 males.

There were 1,407 housing units at an average density of 574.6 per square mile, of the occupied units 691 (55.8%) were owner-occupied and 547 (44.2%) were rented. The homeowner vacancy rate was 2.8%; the rental vacancy rate was 7.8%.  1,563 people (55.3% of the population) lived in owner-occupied housing units and 1,251 people (44.3%) lived in rental housing units.

Economy 

Alturas is the headquarters to the Modoc National Forest, the Applegate Field Office of the Bureau of Land Management, the Modoc National Wildlife Refuge and other recreation areas, and is the trade center for the agricultural region, which produces beef, sheep, potatoes, alfalfa and lumber.  Despite its abundance of wilderness, recreational opportunities, hunting and fishing resources, and natural environment, tourism is not a major sector of the local economy – largely due to the city's remote location.

Local, State, Federal, and Tribal governments are the largest employers in Alturas.  A vibrant timber industry collapsed in the early 1980s due to increased production costs and low market prices for softwood lumber.

The Modoc Joint Unified School District is headquartered in Alturas.

The Alturas Rancheria, a band of Pit River Indians, operates a small casino just outside the city limits.

Government

Transportation

Alturas is served by U.S. Route 395 and California State Route 299. U.S. 395 comes in from the south from Susanville and Reno. State Route 299 comes in from the west from Redding. Both highways merge in Alturas and head out of the city as a concurrency northeast toward Lakeview, Oregon and Cedarville, respectively.

The Modoc Subdivision track of the Union Pacific Railroad and the Lake County Railroad  (of Lake County, Oregon) serve the area. Alturas Municipal Airport is a public-use, general aviation facility located one nautical mile (1.85 km) west of the city's central business district.

Notable people
 Kayte Christensen, WNBA basketball player
 Ernest S. Brown, former United States Senator from Nevada 
 John E. Raker, Congressman from California (1911-1926) and author of the Raker Act
 Robert "Top Gun" Hight, NHRA drag racer John Force Racing H

See also

Modoc County Historical Museum
California Historical Landmarks in Modoc County

References

External links

 
Cities in Modoc County, California
County seats in California
Incorporated cities and towns in California